All Tai Ahom Students Union (ATASU) or Chom Hom Lik Hen Tai Ahom Tang Mung in Ahom language is a students' union in Assam, India.

History
All Tai Ahom Students Union or ATASU is a students' organization in Assam, India founded in 14–15 July 1988. It is the leading students organization of the Tai Ahom people in the state. The Ahom people were the previous ruling community of the state of Assam in Northeastern part of India. Amrit Kumar Chetia, Promod Boruah, Daya Krishna Gogoi, Arun Gogoi, Puspadhar Saikia, Tutumoni Gogoi and Dimbeswar Gogoi, and Bhuban Gohain were the Chief Adviser, President, Working President, General Secretary, Assistant Secretary, Organizing Secretaries and Executive Member of the Founder Committee respectively. Dimbeswar Gogoi, was brutally murdered by ULFA on 3 November 1989.

Movement
The ATASU is spearheading the demand of the Ahom people for being granted the Scheduled Tribe status to the Tai Ahom people.

The ATASU has been using various forums and forms of protest and agitations such as road blockades, bandhs, strikes, etc. to demand the ST status for the Ahom people in the state.

Organizational structure
ATASU recently has the following district committees :
 Tinisukia District Committee
 Dibrugarh District Committee
 Dhemaji District Committee
 North Lakhimpur District Committee
 Sivasagar District Committee
 Charaideo District Committee
 Jorhat District Committee
 Golaghat District Committee
 Kamrup District Committee
 Karbi Anglong District Committee
 Nagaon District Committee
 Morigaon District Committee
 Pasighat District Committee (Arunachal Pradesh)

Karbi Anglong Tai Ahom Students' Union hosted Brihattar Bokajan Rongali Bihu Adoroni (Greater Bokajan Rongali Bihu Celebration) in the middle of April from the year 2010 as a grand festival of Bokajan sub-division of the district. They also host Assam Divas (Sukapha Divas) every year at 2 December. Among the notable members of Karbi Anglong District Tai Ahom Students' Union, Pradyut Pawan Gogoi founded Greater Guwahati Tai Ahom Freshmen Social at Cotton College and the official website of All Tai Ahom Students' Union as the Education Secretary of the organization. He was the first Education Secretary of this ethnic group's organization.

See also
Tai Ahom people
Ahom language
Ahom Kingdom
All Assam Students Union

Notes

References

External links
alltaiahomstudentsunion – ATASU Official website
tadcassam.org – Tai Ahom Development Council website



Organisations based in Assam
Students' unions in India
1988 establishments in Assam
Organizations established in 1988